refers to the classical Japanese performing art of dance.

The term  is a modern term coined during the Meiji period (1868–1911) as a term for "dance", and the writer Tsubouchi Shōyō is believed to have been the first to use the term . As a genre of dance that has multiple influences, borrows from many different dance traditions developed over a long period, overlaps with theatre and has many different schools, there is some difficulty in defining and categorizing .

Definition

Wider definition 

  -  in the exact definition refers solely to  alone
  or  - dance born and developed in the region of Kyoto and Osaka (the Kamigata region).  developed during the Edo period, and would be performed at private parties on a relatively small surface, such as the surface of one tatami mat. Its movements are slow and gentle. It can be accompanied by music, composed for a  soloist. It is also called , referring to the name of the room where it is practiced.
  or  –  has known European and American influences during the 20th century.

Narrower definition 

The term  dates to the Meiji period.

, listed as an important intangible cultural property since 1955, is performed by both a kabuki actor and a  dancer.

Dance styles and elements 
Unlike Noh, kabuki and  theater, which feature male performers,  is also performed by women. Thus, a woman can play a male role, and a man can play a female role.

Influences

Kabuki 
 schools were founded by choreographers (who were originally kabuki musicians or actors), or by actors. These two backgrounds mean that both still share the same dance repertoire.

Noh 
There are many  plays which are inspired by Noh theater plays. For these plays, Noh dance is integrated into the choreography.

Even before the Meiji period, there were already -origin kabuki dance plays, but, like Noh,  was much adapted after the Meiji period, and this repertoire was appropriated by kabuki actors of this period.

Plays 

In addition, there are plays choreographed with the kabuki dance technique. The themes of the plays are plentiful: legends, classical literature, historical figures, crime stories, and life and customs in the Edo period. There are also adaptations of Noh, and  theater.

Plays danced by one person take up about 60% of the repertoire, and plays danced by more than two people make up the rest of the repertoire. About 60% of the plays consist of pure dance plays without drama (metamorphosis play, Edo period daily life play, festive play), compared to around 40% dramatic plays.

Not all parts can be classified perfectly, but they can be roughly grouped into the following categories:

In the Noh play , the most sacred play mixing dance and prayer ritual for a bountiful harvest and prosperity, three characters, Okina, Senzai and Sanbasō, appear.

A number of  center around stories of ghosts or phantoms.
 
 A newly-engaged man burns the letter of a courtesan, with whom he had a love affair. In the smoke, the spirit of the courtesan appears and speaks resentfully.
 
In these plays, the main character is a ghost with two spirits inside. The souls of two lovers who have killed each other come together in an vengeful half-male, half-female spirit.

Inspired by the category of Noh plays about madness, this theme was developed in dance plays from the earliest period of kabuki. In , the central character of the child's mother commonly loses her mind to grief, and becomes a traveling artist who searches for her child, singing and dancing.

 Madness among men: , 

Description of the landscape
 For a long time in Japanese art there has been a style called  which describes a journey to a destination. This theme was very popular with the people of the Edo period, as it depicted the freedom of travelling in contrast to the constriction of movement under the shogunate. However, travellers would also be depicted facing melancholy, such as retribution for wrongdoing or attachment to a person met along the journey they must leave.  themes are found in the plays  (Act VIII of the kabuki play ),  (Act IV of the kabuki play ),  (Act IV of the kabuki play ).
 Double love suicide
 Since the play  (double suicide in Sonezaki) by Chikamatsu Monzaemon, the genre of  has been associated with themes of a double suicide: a couple consider killing each other at the end of their journey. There, character psychology is brought to the fore, and the description of the landscape becomes a background. Later, a new style entered into vogue: a peddler or a street artist intervenes during the couple's journey, remonstrating with them:  (Act IV of the kabuki play ), .

In , the same actor transforms into different characters with a rapid change of costume, and plays between three to twelve (usually seven) characters, one after another – male and female of all ages, from different periods and of all social strata, animals, apparition, and gods.  was very popular at the start of the 19th century, particularly with the two great actors Bandō Mitsugorō III and Nakamura Utaemon III, who competed to develop this genre. Nowadays, many quick-change plays no longer exist in their entirety, with one exception:  (six great poets), a play of one performer transforming into 5 poets, for which all 5 quick-changes are still extant and known of.

 Annual events: , etc.
 Peddler: The variety of occupations among the citizens of Edo was surprising, including a peddler or a street performer, who animated the city of Edo. A peddler was not just a salesman, but was accompanied by various performances or songs, sometimes comical, to attract children, and in some cases with an extravagant costume: , etc.
 Street artist: , etc.

Noh: In the Edo period, when belonging to the warrior class was distinguished from the kabuki which was an entertainment of the popular classes, the adaptation of Noh in the kabuki dance tended to move away from the original piece by completely changing the context, the characters, and the staging. However, in the Meiji era, when the kabuki tried to renew the popular image by introducing the Noh of a high dress, the adaptation of this medieval theater was made by approaching this noble taste, while keeping the content and style of the original piece: , etc.
 : Like Noh,  was adapted in kabuki dance after the Meiji era: , etc.

The  genre, which already existed in the Edo period in the field of music, consists of pieces created to celebrate the founding of a new school, the inheritance of a name or the inauguration of an establishment etc. Also, around the beginning of the Meiji era, musicians broke away from the kabuki world, and school leaders performed new pieces every New Year.

Schools 
Japan has about two hundred nihon-buyō schools, including "five great schools":
 founded in 1849 by Hanayagi Jusuke Ist, who was a disciple of Nishikawa Senzō IVth. This is the school with the most disciples.
 founded by Fujima Kanbei Ist during the Hōei era (1704–1711).
 founded in 1893 by Wakayagi Judō Ist, who was a disciple of Hanayagi Jusuke.
 founded by Nishikawa Senzō Ist during the Genroku era (1688–1704).
 founded by Bandō Mitsugorō IIIrd, kabuki actor representing the Kasei period (1804–1830).

References

Bibliography

External links
 Nihon-buyō Association The main organisation for nihon-buyō
Nihon Buyo Foundation on nihonbuyo.or.jp
List of Kabuki dance plays on Kabuki Play Guide
List of Kabuki dance plays on Kabuki21.com
List of Kabuki dance plays on Invitation to kabuki

Dances of Japan
Performing arts in Japan
Concert dance
Japanese words and phrases